

D09A Medicated dressings

D09AA Medicated dressings with antiinfectives
D09AA01 Framycetin
D09AA02 Fusidic acid
D09AA03 Nitrofural
D09AA04 Phenylmercuric nitrate
D09AA05 Benzododecinium
D09AA06 Triclosan
D09AA07 Cetylpyridinium
D09AA08 Aluminium chlorohydrate
D09AA09 Povidone-iodine
D09AA10 Clioquinol
D09AA11 Benzalkonium
D09AA12 Chlorhexidine
D09AA13 Iodoform

D09AB Zinc bandages
D09AB01 Zinc bandage without supplements
D09AB02 Zinc bandage with supplements

D09AX Soft paraffin dressings

References

D09